N. L. Ganasaraswathi was an Indian playback singer who sang mainly in Tamil films and some Telugu and Malayalam films. She was active in the field during the 1950s and early 60s. She sang many songs based on Carnatic music ragas. Most of her songs were used for dance sequences in the films.

Music directors 
The music directors she sang for include G. Ramanathan, S. V. Venkatraman, S. M. Subbaiah Naidu, M. D. Parthasarathy, P. S. Anantharaman, K. V. Mahadevan, V. Nagayya, Viswanathan–Ramamoorthy, A. Rama Rao, M. S. Gnanamani, G. Govindarajulu Naidu, T. R. Ramnath, Arun, Raghavan, T. R. Pappa, Aswathama, Ghantasala, Br Lakshmanan, P. S. Divakar, K. G. Moorthy and T. A. Kalyanam.

Lyricists 
She sang songs penned by Suratha, M. P. Sivam, Kothamangalam Subbu, Kanakasurabhi, Thandapani, A. Maruthakasi, Kuyilan, T. K. Sundara Vathiyar, Ka. Mu. Sheriff, Kavimani Kavimani Desigavinayagam Pillai, Thirunainar Kurichi Madhavan Nair, Bharathidasan, Surabhi, Kavi Lakshmanadas, Shuddhananda Bharati, Vempati Sadasivabrahmam and V. Seetharaman.

Singers 
She has sung with most of the prominent singers of the time.

Male singers she sang with
Thiruchi Loganathan
T. M. Soundararajan
S. C. Krishnan
Sirkazhi Govindarajan
T. R. Ramachandran
M. K. Thyagaraja Bhagavathar 
Kamukara Purushothaman
T. A. Mothi
V. N. Sundaram

Female singers she sang with
M. L. Vasanthakumari
P. Leela
(Radha) Jayalakshmi
T. V. Rathnam
Jikki
A. P. Komala
A. G. Rathnamala
K. Rani
M. S. Rajeswari
Kalyani
P. S. Vaidhehi

Discography 
Tamil
The following list is compiled from Thiraikalanjiyam Part 1 and Thiraikalanjiyam Part 2

References

External links 
N. L. Ganasaraswathi
N. L. Ganasaraswathi Album
List of Malayalam Songs by Singer N. L. Ganasaraswathi

Indian women playback singers
Tamil playback singers
Telugu playback singers
Singers from Chennai
20th-century Indian singers
20th-century Indian women singers
Women musicians from Tamil Nadu
Possibly living people
Year of birth missing